San José, Veraguas may refer to:

Veraguas Province of Panama:
 San José, Calobre
 San José, Cañazas
 San José, San Francisco

See also
San José (disambiguation)